Hollandsville is an unincorporated community in Kent County, Delaware, United States. Hollandsville is located at the intersection of Delaware Route 12 and Spectrum Farms Road/Hills Market Road, west of Felton.

References

Unincorporated communities in Kent County, Delaware
Unincorporated communities in Delaware